Ust-Khopyorskaya is a rural locality (a stanitsa) and the administrative center of Ust-Khopyorskoye Rural Settlement, Serafimovichsky District, Volgograd Oblast, Russia. The population was 960 as of 2010. There are 18 streets.

Geography 
Ust-Khopyorskaya is located in steppe, 41 km west of Serafimovich (the district's administrative centre) by road. Rybny is the nearest rural locality.

References 

Rural localities in Serafimovichsky District